Parkside Christian Centre, East Sheen, previously known as Elim Pentecostal Church, East Sheen, is a Pentecostal church in the London Borough of Richmond upon Thames at 173 Upper Richmond Road (West), in East Sheen.  It holds services on Sunday mornings at 10:30.

See also
 Elim Pentecostal Church

External links
 Official website

References

Churches in the London Borough of Richmond upon Thames
East Sheen
Elim Pentecostal Church